The women's football tournament at the 2003 Pan American Games was the 2nd. edition of the women's football competition at Pan American Games. It was held in Santo Domingo, Dominican Republic from August 2 to August 15, 2003. Six U-23 teams competed. The defending champion, the United States, did not defend its title. The South American teams played with their U-20 teams. For the second time the women's tournament was included in the Pan Am Games.

Preliminary round

Group A

Group B

Final round

Semi finals

Bronze medal match

Gold medal match

References

2003 in women's association football
Football at the 2003 Pan American Games
Foo